Nnaemeka Favour Ajuru (born 28 September 1986) is a Nigerian professional footballer who plays as a defensive midfielder.

Career
After starting out at Zamfara United, Ajuru arrived to Javor Ivanjica during the 2004–05 season. He was subsequently sent on a season-long loan to Metalac Gornji Milanovac, before returning to Ivanjica ahead of the 2006–07 season. In the following three years, Ajuru established himself as one of the team's most regular players, helping them win the Serbian First League in 2008, with an unbeaten record, thus earning promotion to the Serbian SuperLiga.

In June 2009, together with Miroslav Vulićević, Ajuru was transferred to Vojvodina on a three-year deal. He spent four seasons at the club, helping them reach the Serbian Cup final on three occasions (2010, 2011, and 2013), but failed to win the trophy.

In August 2013, Ajuru moved to Georgian club Zestafoni, agreeing to a two-year contract. He played regularly for the team in the first six months, but failed to make any appearance in the second part of the 2013–14 season. In July 2014, Ajuru had an unsuccessful trial at Azerbaijani club AZAL.

In August 2014, Ajuru returned to Serbia and joined his former club Javor Ivanjica. He helped them win promotion back to the top flight in his comeback season. In the 2015–16 Serbian Cup, Ajuru appeared in all six of his team's matches, as they lost to Partizan in the final.

Honours
Javor Ivanjica
 Serbian First League: 2007–08
 Serbian Cup: Runner-up 2015–16
Vojvodina
 Serbian Cup: Runner-up 2009–10, 2010–11, 2012–13

References

External links
 
 

Association football midfielders
Expatriate footballers in Serbia
Expatriate footballers in Serbia and Montenegro
FC Zestafoni players
FK Jagodina players
FK Javor Ivanjica players
FK Metalac Gornji Milanovac players
FK Spartak Subotica players
FK Vojvodina players
FK Sloboda Užice players
Footballers from Enugu
Nigerian expatriate footballers
Nigerian expatriate sportspeople in Serbia
Nigerian expatriate sportspeople in Serbia and Montenegro
Nigerian footballers
Serbian First League players
Serbian SuperLiga players
1986 births
Living people
Zamfara United F.C. players